Embedded customer relationship management software is built-in to an ERP software and can usually not be used as stand-alone CRM software like Salesforce.com. It has the following characteristics:

 functionalities in marketing, sales and service are integral part of the order-to-cash process within an ERP solution
 deep process integration and seamless data flows from marketing, sales and service to invoicing but less feature rich than best-of-breed marketing, sales and service software
shared master data for customers, contacts, partners, products and prices
same user interface and application server on the same database for all users

See also
Customer-relationship management

References 

Customer relationship management software
ERP software